Bend View Metropark is a regional park located in Waterville, Ohio, owned and managed by Metroparks Toledo and named for its view of a 90-degree bend in the Maumee River.

References

External links
Metroparks Toledo
Park Map

Parks in Toledo, Ohio
Works Progress Administration in Toledo, Ohio
Civilian Conservation Corps in Ohio
Metroparks Toledo
Protected areas of Lucas County, Ohio